Juan Carlos Jiménez Rufino (born 11 January 1951), known as La Mona Jiménez, is a cuarteto singer and songwriter, heralded as one of the most prominent performers of the genre.

Early life
Juan Carlos Jiménez Rufino was born on 11 January 1951 in Córdoba, Argentina. He is of Afro-Argentine descent. He earned the nickname La Mona ("the she-monkey") from his parents, who noted his resemblance to Cheeta the Chimpanzee from the Tarzan TV series.

Musical career
He started singing with Cuarteto Berna when he was 15 years old after winning a contest among 40 other singers. With this group he recorded five albums. 

His first hit was La flaca Marta ("Skinny Marta") from the album Para toda América ("For All America"), released in 1984. His success allowed him to buy three brand-new cars and a house in the barrio of Cerro de Las Rosas, and to pay off a mortgage.

In 40 years of musical career Jiménez has recorded more than 85 CDs and sold more than 36 million copies all over Argentina. His 62nd CD, titled Beso a beso con La Mona ("From kiss to kiss with La Mona") sold more than one hundred thousand copies just in Córdoba. He received the Platinum Konex Award for best Cuarteto soloist/band of the 1985–1995 decade in 1995 and of the 1995–2005 decade in 2005.

He has two daughters, Lorena and Natalia, and a son, Carli, who is also a cuarteto musician.

References

External links
Tunga Tunga —  Cuarteto Website.
 

1951 births
Living people
Afro-Argentine musicians
Musicians from Córdoba, Argentina
Argentine musicians
Cuarteto musicians